Kafka's Breakfast is a compilation album by Djam Karet, released in 1988 through Auricle.

Track listing

Personnel
Djam Karet
Andy Frankel – keyboards, drums, vibraphone, percussion
Mike Henderson – guitar
Chuck Oken – drums, keyboards, twelve-string guitar, voice
Henry J. Osborne – bass guitar
Additional musicians and production
Rychard Cooper – recording on "Walkabout"
Rick Cucuzza – recording on "Walkabout"
Gayle Ellett – guitar on "Walkabout"
Alan Freeman – design
John Glass – guitar on "More Fact Than Figure", "A Way of Life", "Tangerine Rabbit Jam" and "Night Scenes"
Nigel Harris – illustrations
Loren Nerell – recording on "More Fact Than Figure", "A Way of Life", "Tangerine Rabbit Jam" and "Night Scenes"

References

1988 compilation albums
Djam Karet albums